Six is the sixth studio album by American metalcore band For the Fallen Dreams. It was released on February 16, 2018, through Rise Records and was produced by Josh Schroeder. It is their last album to be released on this label before the band signed to Arising Empire in 2022.

Background and promotion
On January 12, 2018, Rise Records released their first single "Stone" and its corresponding music video. On February 9, 2018, the band released their second single "Ten Years".

On March 14, 2018, the music video for "Unstoppable" off of Six was debuted. Bassist Brandon Stastny shot and edited the video. In a brief interview the band told of how the video was shot in their home-state of Michigan a few hundred yards off the coastline on the Lake Michigan shelf ice formations which occur every winter. The day the video was shot was the only clear and sunny day during that month so it couldn't have been more perfect, they explained.

Track listing

Personnel
For the Fallen Dreams
Chad Ruhlig – lead vocals
Jim Hocking – guitars, clean vocals
Brandon Stastny – bass, backing vocals
Marc Esses – drums, percussion

Additional personnel
Josh Schroeder – production, mixing, mastering, engineering

References

2018 albums
For the Fallen Dreams albums
Rise Records albums